Will Ludford (born 25 December 1948) is a British Blues/Rock guitarist and songwriter.

Early life 
Will Ludford was born in Dublin, Ireland; he is the youngest son of Willie and Mary Ludford.  His older brothers, George and Patrick, also played music ,his brother Pat Ludford is a well known traditional singer.. and this talent was handed down from their father who played drums. The family moved to the United Kingdom when he was five years of age. They lived on an American air base in Wing, Buckinghamshire where his father worked. There he listened to early American blues music being played by the American Airmen on the base. When he was seven years old, the family moved to Leighton Buzzard, Bedfordshire,  they first lived in Plantation road in a small cottage with an outside toilet. His father found employment at Vauxhall Motors in Luton. This new job allowed the family to buy a house at 34 Albany road. Will Ludford attended St Georges School and  Brooklands school in Leighton Buzzard..

Career 
Will Ludford has been playing guitar for some time, starting in his first band in Leighton Buzzard with school friends. They played at local school functions and friends parties. They played music by The Beatles, The Rolling Stones, Jimi Hendrix etc. When he left school he worked at Camden Motors Garage, serving petrol and saved enough to buy his first guitar.  he also worked at a music shop located in Bridge street in Leighton Buzzard, which was owned by Richard Watts. of Simms Watts amps  fame.. Here he often jammed with friends Art Nouveau who became Kajagoogoo.

He then joined other local bands and became the guitarist in the rock band, Diamond LiL, who did well on the college circuit in the UK. He joined a band in Buckingham along with Wally Roathe, who went on to be the drummer of  No. 1 chart band Liquid Gold. and the Searchers.    Will Ludford also performed some session work at the Chalk Farm Studios in London. There he met and worked with Alton Ellis and Sly and Robbie, and along with lifelong friend Barry Parsons they wrote and recorded music for holiday videos.   Will Ludford wrote the disco chart hit "Indian Dancer" for the glam rock band Abacus".

In his career,  Will Ludford has worked with numerous well known bands and musicians such as Tiny Tim, Alton Ellis, George Harrison, The Barron Knights, The Detroit Emeralds, Abacus, Joe Meek Reggae star Ezeke Grey.. chalk Farm Recording Studios,. Having several awards presented to him for his music, Will Ludford was humbled to be voted the world's best guitarist for 2014 by XL Radio Europe.

 Will Ludfords album Addicted reached No.1 in the UK Reverb Nation Independent Chart and No.5 in the American Air radio charts. and his album "All I Wanted Is You "  was Number one on the Reverb Nation charts and entered several radio station charts.. Will Ludford is signed to The Big Buzzard Music Group and although his life may have been shared with the public .Will Ludford is actually a very private person, a total vegetarian and a devout Christian,   but he continues to write and record music and has found a new  following as a guitarist  from younger musicians who have discovered his original music.

References

External links
Happy New Year - Single by Will Ludford
Keeping My Eyes On You - Single by Will Ludford
https://www.amazon.co.uk/All-Wanted-You-Will-Ludford/dp/B0957MDDYF

British songwriters
British rock guitarists
British blues guitarists
British male guitarists
1948 births
Living people
British male songwriters